Adetiba is a surname. Notable people with the surname include: 

Kemi Adetiba (born 1980), Nigerian filmmaker
Mayen Adetiba (born 1954), Nigerian actress

Surnames of Nigerian origin